"She's Sure Taking It Well" is a song recorded by American country music artist Kevin Sharp.  It was released in February 1997 as the second single from his debut album. Measure of a Man.  The song reached number 3 on the Billboard Hot Country Singles & Tracks chart in June 1997. It was written by Tim Buppert, Don Pfrimmer and George Teren.

Music video
The music video was directed by Norry Niven and premiered in early 1997.

Chart performance
"She's Sure Taking It Well" debuted at number 75 on the U.S. Billboard Hot Country Singles & Tracks for the week of February 8, 1997.

Year-end charts

References

1997 singles
Kevin Sharp songs
Asylum Records singles
Songs written by Don Pfrimmer
Song recordings produced by Chris Farren (country musician)
1996 songs
Songs written by George Teren